The Washington, Idaho and Montana Railway is a short-line railroad in the northwest United States, described as "a single-track standard gauge steam railroad" that runs between Bovill, Idaho and Palouse, Washington. Construction began  in May 1905 by the Potlatch Lumber Company as a logging railroad, but it also carried other freight, passengers, and mail. By the end of that year,  of track had been laid, and by the end of 1906, the track reached Bovill.

Although the railway was to extend into Montana, these plans were abandoned, for two main reasons. The first was a 1910 forest fire along the North Fork of the Clearwater River, which destroyed valuable timber and the second was an agreement between Chicago, Milwaukee & Puget Sound railway (which operated into Montana) and the Washington, Idaho & Montana railway for joint use of tracks at Bovill and a division of rates.

Engine 1 of the railroad and a railroad depot is preserved in the Commercial Historic District of Potlatch, Idaho, which is listed on the National Register of Historic Places.

References

History of rail transportation in the United States
Rail transportation in Idaho
Rail transportation in Montana
Rail transportation in Washington (state)
Rail transportation on the National Register of Historic Places
Regional railroads in the United States
Defunct Idaho railroads